The Nongo class is a term used by the US Department of Defense to identify a series of new medium-size warships built by North Korea starting in the 2000s. Few such vessels are believed to be in service, but they appear to form the core of a modernized Korean People's Navy.

Features and design 
In late '80s the North Korean shipbuilding industry experimented a large warship with an innovative catamaran-hull design, the Soho class frigate. 
After the '90s, when the North Korean economy showed some signs of recovering after the great famine, the Korean People's Navy started introducing again this design to modernize its fleet of medium-size vessels.

North Koreans implemented the catamaran design, adopting Surface Effect Ship technology. 
The design is relatively advanced, and adopted by few Navies in the world.

The first vessels of the class (the "pure" Nongo) appears to have also stealth lines.

Considering the lack of official north Korean released data, most of features, design and details are speculations of analysts after observation of satellite pictures.

Weapons 
Weapons appears to be related with the different sub-classes, and different evaluations were given by analysts.
The original stealth SES Nongo show only surface artillery weapons: a gun of 57mm and a turret of 30mm

The missile-boats variants at first were valued with one gun of 85mm, one or two turrets of 30mm and unknown kind of anti-surface missiles.

Later, surfaced after north Korean propaganda video that the missile boats are indeed armed with the relatively effective Russian Kh-35 missiles. Also the gun appears to be different, a reversed-engined turret of 76mm (related probably to the Iranian Fajr-27, a reversed-engine gun of the famous Italian OTO Melara 76 mm).

Despite being probably less advanced than their south-Korean rivals, the Nongo Class missile boats could on paper face the South Korean Gumdoksuri-class patrol vessel sharing the same artillery (76mm) and anti-ship missiles (even if the South Korean vessels are larger).

In January 2015 the first pictures of a vessel (of the stealth sub-class), employed in testing a reversed-engineered missile Kh-35, were released by KCNA.

Subclasses 
At least 3 subclasses are known:
 Original stealth SES
 "A" type missile boats (not-stealth, size reduced)
 "B" type missile boats (not-stealth, size reduced)

References 

Missile boats of the Korean People's Navy